Amanda Smith (1837–1915) was an African-American evangelist.

Amanda or Mandy Smith may also refer to:

Amanda Abbington, (born Amanda Jane Smith, 1974), English actress
Amanda Barnes Smith (1809–1886), Mormon pioneer and heroine
Amanda Smith ( 1925), founder of Mrs. Smith's, a US pie manufacturer
Amanda Smith (broadcaster), presenter of Australian radio program Sporty
Amanda Smith (Miss Pennsylvania), American beauty pageant titleholder, Miss Pennsylvania 2014
Mandy Smith (field hockey) (born 1972), New Zealand field hockey player
Mandy Smith (born 1970), English dance-pop singer and former model